Statistics of the V-League in the 1986 season.

First phase

20 participants divided over 3 groups playing double round robin;
top-2 of each to second phase.

Similar to some Soviet Top League seasons, a draw limit was used. In this case, from the 4th draw on points would not be counted.

Second phase

6 participants playing single round robin; no draws

Results Saigon Port
Saigon Port    2–0 Army Club 
Saigon Port    drw Ha Nam Ninh Industry           [4–1 pen]
Saigon Port    2–1 HCM City Industrial Department 
Saigon Port    4–1 HCM City Custom 
Saigon Port    1–0 HCM City Police

Champions: Saigon Port

References

Vietnamese Super League seasons
1
Viet
Viet